Larry the Lobster may mean:
 Larry the Lobster, subject of an Eddie Murphy sketch on Saturday Night Live
 Larry the Lobster, a character from the television cartoon series SpongeBob SquarePants
 "Larry the Lobster", a nickname for the Big Lobster tourist attraction in Kingston SE, South Australia